Hulu Perak District (Upper Perak) is a district in Perak, Malaysia. As the largest district in Perak, there  are border to the east of the district is the state of Kelantan, to the west is Kedah, to the south is the district of Kuala Kangsar while to the south-west is the district of Larut, Matang and Selama. Hulu Perak also shares a border with Betong District of Thailand. The seat of the district is Gerik, which is also the largest town of the district.

The highest point of the district is located at Titiwangsa Mountains, with 1,533 m high Ulu Titi Basah peak near the Thai/Malaysian border, and Temenggor Lake.

History

In 1511, after the fall of the Malacca Sultanate to the Portuguese, Sultan Mahmud Shah retreated and established his government in Bentan. In 1526 the Portuguese attacked his domain again and forced him to retreat to Kampar and to establish his rule there.

At that time, Tun Saban had moved to Upper Patani and stayed at Beredung Budi. He then moved to Belum Forest in Hulu Perak, founded a village at a place called Relap Hati, and became the chief of the peoples in Belum Forest.

For sometime until the 19th century, a good part of this district was under the sovereignty of Siam, as part of the old Malay kingdom of Reman. The area then under Thai control included what is today Gerik, Pengkalan Hulu (Kroh), Kerunai, the Belum forest and the Temenggor Lakes. The capital of Reman was near Pengkalan Hulu.

In 1882, the border between the then-British protected state of Perak and the Siamese vassal state of Reman was delimited at Bukit Nasha, some 5 km south of Gerik town.

An adjustment in 1899 transferred Gerik town and the surrounding commune to the Federated Malay States, which Perak was then part of.

The present-day border, part of the longer Malaysia-Thailand border, was finalised in 1909, when the districts of Pengkalan Hulu, Kerunai, Belukar Semang, Belum and the present-day Temenggor Lakes were transferred to the FMS. The British also gained control of Perlis, Kedah, Kelantan and Terengganu.

Administrative divisions

Hulu Perak District is divided into 10 mukims and three district councils, which are:
 Under Pengkalan Hulu District Council
 Pengkalan Hulu (with Klian Intan)
 Belukar Semang 
 Under Gerik District Council
 Gerik (with Kuala Rui)
 Belum
 Kenering (with Lawin)
 Kerunai
 Temenggor (with Banding Island)
 Under Lenggong District Council
 Lenggong
 Durian Pipit (with Tasik Raban)
 Temelong (with Kota Tampan)

The municipalities of Pengkalan Hulu and Lenggong are autonomous subdistricts (daerah kecil).

Demographics 

The following is based on Department of Statistics Malaysia 2010 census.

Federal Parliament and State Assembly Seats 

List of Hulu Perak district representatives in the Federal Parliament (Dewan Rakyat)

List of Hulu Perak district representatives in the State Legislative Assembly

See also
 Districts of Malaysia

References

External links

Rancangan Tempatan Daerah Hulu Perak 2030